Marie Antoinette: The Portrait of an Average Woman is a 1932 biography of the French queen Marie Antoinette by Austrian writer Stefan Zweig.

The Viking Press published the first English-language edition, translated by Eden and Cedar Paul, in 1933. The book was the basis for the 1938 Metro-Goldwyn-Mayer film, Marie Antoinette, starring Norma Shearer.

See also
 1932 in literature
 Austrian literature

References

1932 non-fiction books
Austrian books
Biographies adapted into films
Biographies of Marie Antoinette
Works by Stefan Zweig